Zydeco Junkie is an album by the Zydeco band Chubby Carrier and the Bayou Swamp Band, released in 2010.  It received the 2010 Grammy award for Best Zydeco or Cajun Music Album. Jamie Bergeron and Geno Delafose make special guest appearances.

Reception
Dan Willging of OffBeat Magazine gave the album positive reviews citing the focused vocals and originality of the album.

Awards
Zydeco Junkie won the Grammy award for Best Zydeco or Cajun Music Album.  Also, it won the Best Zydeco Album from OffBeat Magazine for 2010.

Track listing

References

2010 albums
Chubby Carrier albums
Grammy Award for Best Zydeco or Cajun Music Album